Lieutenant-General Sir Bahadur Shumsher Jung Bahadur Rana C.B.E GCSI was a Nepalese diplomat. He was the first Nepalese Ambassador to the United Kingdom.

He was born in 1892 to Juddha Shumsher Jung Bahadur Rana and Padma Kumari. In 1934, Rana was appointed as the first Nepalese Ambassador to the United Kingdom by his father. In 1936, He was succeeded by Krishna Shumsher Jung Bahadur Rana. He died in 1977 in Bahadur Bhawan, Kathmandu. His son Nara Shumsher Jang Bahadur Rana served as the second police chief of Nepal Police.

He was gifted the Charburja Durbar which he later sold to Prince Basundhara of Nepal.

Honours 

  Order of the British Empire
  Knight Grand Commander of the Order of the Star of India
  British War Medal
  Legion of Honour
 Order of the Bath
  Order of the Crown of Italy
  Order of the Star of Nepal
  Order of Gorkha Dakshina Bahu

References

External links 

 TKV: First Ambassador of Nepal to UK Bahadur Shumsher Jung Bahadur Rana on YouTube

1892 births
1977 deaths
19th-century Nepalese nobility
20th-century Nepalese nobility
Ambassadors of Nepal to the United Kingdom
Children of prime ministers of Nepal
Nepalese Hindus
Nepalese military personnel
Rana dynasty
Honorary Members of the Order of the British Empire
Knights Grand Commander of the Order of the Star of India
Recipients of the Legion of Honour
Recipients of the Order of the Star of Nepal
Members of the Order of Gorkha Dakshina Bahu